Combat is a 1927 American silent adventure film directed by Albert Hiatt and starring George Walsh, Bradley Barker and Claire Adams.

Cast
 George Walsh as 	Jack Hammond
 Bradley Barker as 	Capt. Samuel Yearkes
 Claire Adams as Wanda, his ward
 Gladys Hulette as Risa Bartlett
 Dex Reynolds as 	Craig Gordon

References

Bibliography
 Munden, Kenneth White. The American Film Institute Catalog of Motion Pictures Produced in the United States, Part 1. University of California Press, 1997.

External links
 

1927 films
1927 adventure films
American silent feature films
American adventure films
American black-and-white films
Pathé Exchange films
1920s English-language films
1920s American films
Silent adventure films